Dimani Assembly constituency (formerly, Dimni) is one of the 230 Vidhan Sabha (Legislative Assembly) constituencies of Madhya Pradesh state in central India. This constituency was reserved for the candidates belonging to the Scheduled castes till 2008.

Dimani (constituency number 7) is one of the six Vidhan Sabha constituencies located in Morena district. This constituency covers parts of Ambah and Morena tehsils.

Dimani is part of Morena Lok Sabha constituency.

Members of Legislative Assembly

See also
 Morena district

References

Morena district
Assembly constituencies of Madhya Pradesh